J. Nicholls (born 1867) was an English footballer who played in the Football League for West Bromwich Albion.

References

1867 births
Date of death unknown
English footballers
West Bromwich Albion F.C. players
English Football League players
Association football midfielders